Saint Paul High School is a private, Catholic high school located in Norwalk, Ohio. It is part of Norwalk Catholic Schools, a K-12 organization of schools and parishes in Norwalk and neighboring Milan.  SPHS has a current enrollment of 237 students and is one of fourteen high schools in the Roman Catholic Diocese of Toledo.  The athletic teams are called the Flyers.

History 
In 1917, when Fr. George Forst became the pastor at St. Paul Church he did everything he could to make St. Paul High School (then a two-year commercial High School) into a four-year licensed High School. Fr. Forst went to the Fisher Family who owned Fisher Body and asked them for help in the realization of his dream.

The School was completed in 1921.  It was the first Roman Catholic Four Year Licensed High School between Cleveland and Toledo.  The school also boasted of containing one of the most sophisticated High School Chemistry Labs in the state at the time.

Athletics 
St. Paul High School is a member of the Firelands Conference.

Football
The SPHS Football team won their first regional championship in 1996, and were three-time state runners-up in 1997, 1999, and 2004. In 2006, the team once again advanced to the semifinals in the OHSAA Division VI playoffs.  In both 2007 and 2008, they finished as Division 6 Region 21 runners-up.  In 2009, the Flyers won their first state championship with a 24-21 victory over Delphos St. John's when quarterback Eric Schwieterman scored the winning touchdown with 5 seconds left to play.  Schwieterman had all three of the Flyers touchdowns; Jim Roth pitched in with a field goal. In 2014, St. Paul won another regional title, this time within Division VII, Region 23, and were once again state runners-up.

Golf
The 2004 SPHS Golf Team made it to the Division III State Championship for the first time in school history. The Flyers finished in third place, losing in a third-place tie-breaker with Lima Central Catholic.

Volleyball
The SPHS Lady Flyers have also advanced to the Final Four of the state volleyball tournament six times since 2002.  In 2002 they won the State Championship with a record of 29-0, beating opponent Maria Stein Marion Local.  In 2006 they won it for a second time finishing the season with a mark of 26-3, beating opponent New Knoxville. In 2007 and 2009, the Lady Flyers once again made it to the state finals but lost to Maria Stein Marion Local.

Basketball
The Flyers have had some past success in their basketball career.  Their record includes six Firelands Conference championships (1974,1979,1984,1995,1996,& 1997), 9 Sectional Championships (1993,1995,1996,1997,1998,2000,2002,2006,&2009), 3 District Championships (1995,1996,&1997), and a Regional Championship (1996).
The Lady Flyers have also been successful with 4 Conference Championships (1988,1989,1993,&1999),10 Sectional Championships (1978, 1989,1993, 1999, 2001, 2002, 2003, 2004, 2005,& 2009), & a District Championship (2001).

Academic Team 

In 2007-08 the SPHS Academic Challenge Team won their first Firelands Conference championship since 2000. Led by Senior captains Josh Wise and Michael Kaple, they went 9-0 in regular season competition. The advisor and coach of that year was Judy "Frau" Howard. Frau (the German language teacher) had been retired from coaching for several years, but returned to lead the Flyers back to the top of the conference.

The 2008-09 Academic Challenge Team, despite losing four Seniors, competed with determination and dedication, but couldn't pull out a top five finish.  The team also competed in the Academic Challenge competition broadcast on WEWS Newschannel 5 (the local ABC affiliate in Cleveland) and defeated their two opponents.  Though they failed to match their success from the previous year, they still performed well.

In 2010-11 the SPHS Academic Challenge Team Won first place in the BGSU Firelands Challenge under team advisor Michael "Herr" Lawson, the former German language teacher.

Ohio High School Athletic Association State Championships 

 Boys Football - 2009 
 Girls Volleyball – 2002, 2006

References

External links 
 Norwalk Catholic School Website

Educational institutions established in 1921
Catholic secondary schools in Ohio
High schools in Huron County, Ohio
Roman Catholic Diocese of Toledo